The 2005 Smartnav SEAT Cupra Championship season was the third season of the SEAT Cupra Championship. It began on 10 April at Donington Park, and ended on 2 October at Brands Hatch, after eighteen rounds held in England and Scotland. Cars were now entered by independent teams rather than SEAT themselves, meaning less performance parity but involving more people in the series.

After finishing third in 2004, Tom Boardman won the title, by 15 points from Mat Jackson. Tom Ferrier was third on 219 points, fourth was Carl Breeze on 191 points and fifth was Alan Blencowe who finished on 116.

Teams and drivers
All entries ran the Mk1 SEAT León.

Calendar

Championship standings
 Points were awarded as follows:

External links
 2005 season results on the SEAT Sport UK website

SEAT Cupra Championship
SEAT Cupra Championship seasons